FC Concordia is  a Saint Martin football club that currently plays in the Saint-Martin Championships, the highest level of football on Saint Martin. The club's home ground is the Stade Vanterpool in Marigot, Saint Martin.

Current squad

Achievements
Saint-Martin Championships champions (1): 2011/12

References

External links
Facebook page

Concordia
Marigot, Saint Martin
Association football clubs established in 1997